Fengxian District, is a suburban district in the south of Shanghai with a land area of , a registered population (as of 2010) of 1,083,400, and 1.5 to 2 times more migrants. It is known for its relative rusticity, as well as its beaches and ocean resorts along the Hangzhou Bay. Bihai Jinsha is a common place for Shanghainese to spend their weekend.

Overview
Nanqiao is a major town in Fengxian district, which recent development has more than doubled in size. Of particular interest is Guhua Park which contains the "Three Women Temple" or "Ancestral Hall". During the Zhou dynasty, the King of Wu's three daughters hanged themselves rather than be caught by the King of Yue's soldiers.  The town is also a short taxi ride from Xinghai Beach and its resorts, also slated for development.  Nanqiao has a 1000-bed medical center, the Fengxian District Central Hospital, which is an all-discipline tertiary hospital.

Nanqiao is about 30 minutes from downtown Shanghai by car or about 1–2 hours by public transit. It can be reached by taking the Line 1 subway to Xinzhuang and transferring to the Line 5 subway to Dongchuan Road. Alternatively, one can transfer to the Xinnan Bus at Xinzhuang, the Nanmei Line from Jinjiang Park to Nanqiao Bus Station, or the Shangfeng Bus at the Shanghai South Railway Station Station's South Square.

Towns

Climate

Economy
M&G Stationery has its corporate headquarters in the district.  Tesla Gigafactory 3 touches the eastern district border.

References

Further reading

External links

Districts of Shanghai